The 2021 Women's Junior Pan American Championship was the 12th edition of the Women's Pan American Junior Championship, the women's international under-21 field hockey championship of the Americas organized by the Pan American Hockey Federation.

The tournament was held alongside the men's tournament at the Prince of Wales Country Club in Santiago, Chile and was originally scheduled to take place from 30 November to 13 December 2020. On 29 May 2020 the Pan American Hockey Federation announced that the tournament was rescheduled and would take place from 12 to 25 April 2021. Later on 15 January, it was announced that the competition would take place from 22 to 28 August 2021. 

Argentina were the defending champions, winning the 2016 edition. This tournament served as the Pan American qualifier for the 2021 FIH Junior World Cup, with the top three qualifying.

Squads

Head Coach: Rolando Rivero

María Moretti (GK)
Sol Alías
Lucía Ponce
Anna Goldstein
María del Carril
María Lorenzini
Josefina Nardi (C)
Amparo Correa
Sofía Ramallo
Emilia Bazzana
Malena Cerviño
Candela Nobile
Luciana Belizon
Julieta Milazzotto
Martina Gabutti
Sol Guignet
Martina Giacchino
Agustina Benedetti (GK)

Head Coach:  Patrick Tshutshani

Ishaval Sekhon (GK)
Stefanie Sajko
Madison Workman
Katie Lynes
Anna Mollenhauer
Jordyn Faiczak
Rebecca Carvalho
Thora Rae
Nora Struchtrup
Sara Goodman (C)
Bronwyn Bird
Samantha McCrory
Melanie Scholz
Danielle Husar
Jenna Berger
Julia Ross
Nora Goddard-Despot
Lucy Wheeler (GK)

Head Coach: Emiliano Monteleone

Rosario Lanz (GK)
Paula Sanz
Amanda Martínez
Francisca Parra (C)
Valeria Nazal
Dominga Lüders
Micaela Stockins
Fernanda Arrieta
Simone Avelli
Michelle de Witt
Antonia Irazoqui
Constanza Jugo
Carolina Mujíca
Francisca Irazoqui
Fernanda Ramírez
Constanza Péres
Milagros Gago
Antonia Sáez (GK)

Head Coach: Emiliano Monteleone

Jamie James (GK)
Chelsea Dey
Tahirah Wynne
Felicia King (C)
Shaniah de Freitas (C)
Naomi Sampson
Aaliyah O'Neil
Mia Oltero
Saarah Olton
Nicole Whiteman
Shania Gajadhar
T'Shana Chance
Rebekah Ngui
Samantha Olton
Kaitlyn Olton
Shaniqua Paul
Talia Seale (GK)
Adrianna Camps

Head Coach: Tracey Paul

Ashley Sessa
Kathryn Peterson
Charlotte de Vries
Emma DeBerdine
Hope Rose
Lindsay Dickinson
Sofía Southam
Madeleine Zimmer
Leah Crouse
Kayla Blas
Lauren Wadas
Abigail Tamer
Gracyn Banks
Skyler Caron
Riley Donnelly
Alia Marshall (C)
Gianna Glatz (GK)
Annabel Skubisz (GK)

Head Coach: Andrés Vázquez

Guilermina Borrazas (GK)
Florencia Penalba
Pilar Oliveros
Elisa Civetta
Agustina Martínez
Cecilia León
Magdalena Verda
Manuela Quinones
María Barreiro
Lucía Santucci
Guadalupe Curutchague
Manuela Vidal
Josefina Esposto
Agustina Suárez
Manuela Serra
Carolina Curico
Jimena García (C)
María Bate (GK)

Preliminary round

Pool A

Pool B

Classification round

Fifth place game

First to fourth place classification

Semi-finals

Third place game

Final

Statistics

Final standings

Awards
The following awards were given at the conclusion of the tournament.

Goalscorers

See also
 2021 Men's Junior Pan American Championship

References

Women's Pan-Am Junior Championship
Pan American Junior Championship
International women's field hockey competitions hosted by Chile
Pan American Junior Championship
Pan American Junior Championship
Sports competitions in Santiago
2020s in Santiago, Chile
Pan-Am Junior Championship
Pan American Championship